Ayisha Malik is a British author. Her debut novel Sofia Khan is Not Obliged was published in 2015. The sequel, The Other Half of Happiness, was published in 2017. Malik was a consultant for Nadiya Hussain's novel The Secret Lives of the Amir Sisters.

Early life and education 
Malik was born in London and has lived and worked in the city all of her life.  She studied English literature at Kingston University and completed a master's degree in creative writing.

Literary career 
Like the protagonist in her novel, Sofia Khan is Not Obliged, Malik worked as a publicist for a publishing house. She was selected as a WH Smith Fresh Talent pick in 2016. Her debut novel Sofia Khan is Not Obliged has been optioned for television.

Malik is Muslim and draws on her experiences as a Muslim woman in her writing. Her two novels focus on Muslim dating and marriage.

Bibliography 

 2015: Sofia Khan is Not Obliged, Twenty7,  
 2017: The Other Half of Happiness, Bonnier Zaffre. 
 2019: This Green and Pleasant Land, Bonnier. 
 2022: Sofia Khan and the Baby Blues, Headline Publishing Group,  
 2022: The Movement, Headline Publishing Group,

References 

British Asian writers
Writers from London
Alumni of Kingston University
Living people
Year of birth missing (living people)